Sydney Park (born October 31, 1997) is an American actress. She is best known for her roles as Cyndie in AMC's The Walking Dead, Gabby Phillips in Instant Mom, Caitlin Park-Lewis in Pretty Little Liars: The Perfectionists and Makani Young in the Netflix film There's Someone Inside Your House.

Personal life 
Park was born in Berkeley, CA and moved to Los Angeles when she was five-years-old where she went to various performing arts/magnet schools all over the city. Her mother is from Philadelphia and her father was born in Seoul, Korea, then moved to Brooklyn, NY, and eventually San Francisco, CA. Park currently resides in Los Angeles.

Career 
Park got her start in 2003 when she was the "Youngest comedian to ever perform at the famous Hollywood Improv (now The Improv)". In 2006, she auditioned for the first season of American reality competition America's Got Talent under the stage name Syd the Kid, where she had advanced on to the semi-finals. Park had to drop out due to her acting career. She made her television debut on the teen sitcom That's So Raven in 2006.

In 2010, Park was hired to play Ellie Danville, the adopted daughter of Detective Jo Danville on CSI: NY.<ref>{{cite web|url=http://www.csifiles.com/content/2010/10/new-york-casts-young-actress-for-family-role/|title=New York Casts Young Actress For Family Role|last=Trongo|first=Rachel|date=October 12, 2010|access-date=April 6, 2012}}</ref> In 2010, Park also starred as "Tootsie Roll" in the independent dark-comedy Spork.

From 2013 to 2015, Park starred as Gabby in the Nick at Nite show Instant Mom.

In 2016, Park began portraying Cyndie on The Walking Dead.

In 2017, Park starred as Meredith in the supernatural horror film Wish Upon. In the same year, she starred on the YouTube science fiction series Lifeline.

In March 2018, it was announced the Park would be starring in the new television series Pretty Little Liars: The Perfectionists as Caitlin Park-Lewis. It premiered in March 2019 on Freeform. In September 2019, Freeform canceled the series after one season.

In 2019, Park appeared as Winter in the third season of the Netflix horror-comedy series Santa Clarita Diet. In the same year, she was cast as Makani Young in the slasher film There's Someone Inside Your House, and as Kiera Pascal in the comedy Moxie directed by Amy Poehler, both released by Netflix in 2021.

In May 2021, Park was announced to be starring as a lead in the romantic drama First Love'' alongside Hero Fiennes Tiffin. Park has also appeared on The Wayne Ayers Podcast.

Filmography

References

External links

1997 births
Living people
21st-century American actresses
African-American female comedians
Actresses from Philadelphia
American child actresses
American actresses of Korean descent
American stand-up comedians
American women comedians
America's Got Talent contestants
African-American actresses
21st-century American comedians
21st-century African-American women
21st-century African-American people